The Etna class were two cruisers originally ordered in Italy for the Thai Navy in 1938 and subsequently requisitioned for service by the Italian Navy on the outbreak of World War II, neither ship was completed and the damaged hulls were scrapped after the war.

Design

The Thai government ordered two light cruisers from CRDA, Trieste in 1938. The ships were to displace 5,500 tons and be armed with six  guns in three twin turrets. Work on the vessels continued after Italy entered the war at a slowed pace until the Italian government took over the contract in late 1941.

The Italians modified the design to have  guns as main armament and  guns as anti-aircraft armament. The aircraft equipment and torpedo tubes were also deleted and the superstructure modified. Extra cargo space comprising four holds of  total volume, was also included to enable the ships to act as fast transports to North Africa. Collapsible crane derricks were fitted to access the cargo space. Extra accommodation was fitted in the former seaplane hangar and on the main deck.

Ships

When Italy surrendered to the Allies in September 1943 the hulls of the ships were 53% complete. Although both vessels were sabotaged before being captured by the Germans, they were able to continue some construction work before abandoning the project. The ships were scuttled in Trieste harbour in 1945. The hulls were re-floated and scrapped in the late 1950s.

References

External links
 Etna (1941) Marina Militare website

 
Cruiser classes
World War II cruisers of Italy
Cruisers of the Regia Marina
Cruisers of the Royal Thai Navy
Ships built in Trieste
Ships of the Royal Thai Navy
Ships built by Cantieri Riuniti dell'Adriatico
Italy–Thailand relations